"Why Me" is a song written by Dennis DeYoung that was first released on Styx's 1979 double-platinum album Cornerstone. It was also released as the second single from the album, and reached #26 on the Billboard Hot 100 and #10 on the Canada RPM Top 100 Singles chart.

Background
DeYoung wrote "Why Me" at a time that he was depressed. He stated that "What I was saying was, why does this keep happening to me?  I'm supposed to have it made, but I feel just like you do."  At a concert in Chicago in 1980, DeYoung further explained the song as follows:

Eric Hegedus of The Morning Call noted that "Why Me" is one of the songs on Cornerstone reminiscent of Styx's previous style (as opposed to  songs like "Babe," "First Time" and "Boat on the River") and found it similar to "I'm O.K." from Styx' prior album Pieces of Eight.

Wichita Beacon reviewer Terre Johnson stated that "Why Me" (along with "Babe" and "Love in the Midnight" from the same album) incorporates Styx' first use of strings and horns and that those instruments "provide effective textures."

Ultimate Classic Rock critic Eduardo Rivadavia regarded "Why Me" as one of the songs on Cornerstone that combined "Styx’s familiar hard-rock foundation and instrumental prowess...with incrementally catchy choruses, gorgeous three-part harmonies, loads of bright synthesizers and even saxophones" while avoiding "the complicated arrangements or cerebral wordplay" from Styx's earlier records.

The song was an unexpected single. The original plan was for the ballad "First Time" to be released as the second single following the #1 single "Babe." In fact some radio stations in the U.S. were starting to play "First Time". However, guitarist Tommy Shaw did not want to release a second ballad right after "Babe". This disagreement resulted in DeYoung being fired briefly from the band in early 1980. DeYoung reluctantly agreed, and "Why Me" was chosen by A&M Records to be the second single.

Reception
Billboard compared "Why Me" to songs by Queen and Supertramp, describing it as a "high gloss, multi layered midtempo rocker with its fresh harmonies and thoughtful lyrics" and also praised the saxophone and guitar solo.  Cash Box called it "an intriguing blend of regal electronic arrangements and bubbly keyboard phrases."  Record World called it a "dramatic pop-rocker," saying that "DeYoung's rousing vocals play off a lilting keyboard that transforms into a progressive instrumental break."  Vincennes Sun-Commercial critic Rick Patterson called it "a definite single pick for AM radio, a soft vocal ballad that really lays you back," also calling out its interesting use of saxophone and string instruments and praising DeYoung's vocal performance.

Released as Cornerstones second single, "Why Me" reached #26 on the Billboard Hot 100 singles chart in February 1980.  The song also reached number 10 on the Canada RPM Top 100 Singles chart on the week of February 23, 1980.

Allmusic critic Stephen Thomas Erlewine criticized the compilation album Come Sail Away – The Styx Anthology for excluding this song.

Live performances
In live performances in the early 1980s, Styx would incorporate a saxophone player and four horn players just for "Why Me" and would use them to play an extended instrumental section.

Personnel
Dennis DeYoung - lead vocals, keyboards
James Young - lead guitar, backing vocals
Tommy Shaw - rhythm guitar, backing vocals
Chuck Panozzo - bass guitar
John Panozzo - drums

Additional musicians
Steve Eisen - saxophone

"Lights"
The b-side of the "Why Me" single was "Lights," another song from Cornerstone that was written by DeYoung and Tommy Shaw.  "Lights was issued as a single a-side in the UK, Germany and Spain and reached #35 on the German charts.  Allmusic critic Mike DeGagne described "Lights" as having "silky harmonies and welcoming choruses."  Edmonton Journal critic Nancy Arab found "Lights" to be one of the few worthwhile songs on Cornerstone ("Why Me" and "Babe" being the others) and said that the band sounds similar to Supertramp on the song due to the keyboard and vocal performances.  Rolling Stone critic David Fricke said it was "enlivened by a bouncy beat and a hint of horns, [and] boasts yet another hook on which you could hang your AM radio.  Hegedus of Morning Call found it to be "triumphant."  When Styx performed "Lights" in concert in 1980, a light show involving colored lights and strobes was displayed.

References

1979 songs
Styx (band) songs
Songs written by Dennis DeYoung
1979 singles
A&M Records singles